A California roll is a kind of sushi.

California Roll may also refer to:

Books
California Roll, a Moses Wine detective novel by Roger L. Simon 1985

Music
California Roll, jazz album by Osamu Kitajima 1975, reissued CBS 1988
California Roll, jazz guitar album by Chuei Yoshikawa Voss Records 1987  
"California Roll" (song), song by Snoop Dogg
"California Roll", by Times New Viking from album Dancer Equired!

Other
California Roll, vert skating trick by Eito Yasutoko